Big Brother: Most Wanted 2018, also known as Big Brother All Stars 2018 was the sixth season of the all-star spin-off of Big Brother and the twentieth-second season of the format in Bulgaria overall. It was announced on October 19, 2018. Followed the same air schedule as in previous years, it commenced on Nova Television on 5 November 2018, immediately after the VIP Brother 10 finale and lasted for a month, ending on 10 December 2018. It featured housemates from previous seasons of the show, as well as participants from other reality formats. Stefan "Wosh MC" Ivanov won with Dzhuliana Gani as the runner-up.

Housemates
12 housemates entered the house on Day 1.

Albena 
Albena Vuleva was a contestant from VIP Brother 6 where she finished fifth and The Celebrity Apprentice. She entered the house on Day 1 and was the sixth evicted on Day 33.

Djuliana 

Djuliana Gani was a contestant from VIP Brother 9 where she finished fifth. She entered the house on Day 1 and finished second in the finale on Day 36.

Emilia 
Emilia Tsvetkova "Emanuela" was a contestant from VIP Brother 8 where she finished third and The Mole 1. She entered the house on Day 1 and decided to walk out of the house on Day 22 with Martin.

Evgenia 
Evgenia Kalkandzieva "Jeni" was a contestant from VIP Brother 6 where she finished fourth with her husband Stefan Manov "Tacho" and The Mole 1. She entered the house on Day 1 and was the first evicted on Day 8.

Nikita 
Nikita Jönsson was a contestant from Big Brother 5 where she won. She entered the house on Day 1 and finished third in the finale on Day 36.

Stanimir 
Stanimir Gumov "Gumata" was a contestant from VIP Brother 7 where he finished fourth and Your Face Sounds Familiar 1 where he finished third. He entered the house on Day 1 and finished fourth in the finale on Day 36.

Stefan 
Stefan Ivanov "Wosh MC" was a contestant from VIP Brother 6 where he finished third. He entered the house on Day 1 and became a winner on Day 36.

Stoyan 
Stoyan Royanov "Ya-Ya" was a Eurovision 2008 candidate. He entered the house on Day 1 and was the third evicted on Day 22.

Stoyko 

Stoyko Sakaliev was a contestant from VIP Brother 5. He entered the house on Day 1 and was the fourth evicted on Day 29.

Tsvetan 
Tsvetan Andreev "Tsetso" was a contestant from The cherry of the cake. He entered the house on Day 1 and was the fifth evicted on Day 33.

Vesela 
Vesela Neynski was a contestant from VIP Brother 1. She entered the house on Day 1 and was the second evicted on Day 15.

Zlatka & Blagoy 

Zlatka Raykova was a contestant from Temptation Island, Big Brother All Stars 2 where she finished fifth and Your Face Sounds Familiar 6 and Blagoy Georgiev "Dzhizusa" ("The Jesus") was a contestant from The cherry of the cake. They entered the house (as individual participants) on Day 1 and finished fifth in the finale on Day 36.

Houseguests

Borislav
Borislav Borisov was a contestant from Big Brother 3, Big Brother All Stars 1 where he finished third and boyfriend of Nikita. He entered the House on Day 19 and left the House on Day 24.

Martin
Martin Nikolov "Elvisa" ("The Elvis") is a boyfriend of Emilia. He entered the House on Day 18 and left the House on Day 22.

Nominations table

Notes

References

External links
 Official website

2018 Bulgarian television seasons
VIP Brother seasons
2018 Bulgarian television series endings